Heini is both a given name and a surname. It is mainly a masculine given name in German-speaking countries, but a feminine given name in Finland. However, in Wales, it is a both masculine and feminine given name, meaning 'healthy and spirited'. Currently, in Wales, it is more commonly recognised and a female given name. Notable people with the name include:

People with the given name 
 Heini Adams (born 1980), South African rugby union player
 Heini Becker (born 1935), Australian politician
 Heini Bock (born 1981), Namibian rugby union player
 Heini Brüggemann, German sprint canoeist
 Heini Dittmar (1911–1960), German glider pilot
 Heini Halberstam (1927–2014), British mathematician
 Heini Hediger (1908–1992), Swiss biologist 
 Heini Hemmi (born 1949), Swiss alpine skier
 Heini Klopfer (1918–1968), German ski jumper and architect
 Heini Koivuniemi (born 1973), Finnish strongwoman competitor
 Heini Lohrer (1918–2011), Swiss ice hockey player
 Heini Meng (1902–?), Swiss ice hockey player
 Heini Müller, Swiss footballer
 Heini Müller (footballer, born 1934), German footballer
 Heini Otto (born 1954), Dutch footballer
 Heini Salonen (born 1993), Finnish tennis player
 Heini Vatnsdal (born 1991), Faroese football player
 Heini Walter (1927–2009), Swiss racing driver
 Heini Wathén (born 1955), Finnish female model
 Heini Gruffudd (born 1946), Welsh Author

People with the surname 
 Riku Heini (born 1990), Finnish footballer

See also 
 Heinis, French automobile
 Heine (surname)
 Heinrich (given name)

Finnish feminine given names
German masculine given names
Swiss masculine given names